Burlington School District is a school district in Vermont. It has its headquarters in Burlington.

The budget for 2009-10 was $49.9 million.  The increase in fiscal year 2009 was a voter approved 9.9% above the prior year. The percentage increase was above the state average. This amount was exceeded by $750,000.

In 2008, about 26% of the city's 3,600 students were minorities. This contrasts with the state where 96% of the population was white.

The Burlington School District is a partner in the Burlington School Food Project, a food program that aims to bring fresh produce to students and their families.

Schools
 Burlington High School
 Barnes Elementary
 Edmunds Elementary School, named for George F. Edmunds, a U.S. Senator for 25 years, from 1866 to 1891.
 Edmunds Middle School
 Hunt Middle School
 Flynn Elementary
 Champlain Elementary School
 C. P. Smith Elementary
 Wheeler Elementary
 Sustainability Academy At Lawrence Barnes

References

External links

 

School districts in Vermont
Education in Burlington, Vermont